is a Japanese sprinter.

She competed for the Japanese team in the 4 × 100 metres relay at the 2012 Summer Olympics; the team placed 15th with a time of 44.25 in Round 1 and did not qualify for the final.

International competitions

1Did not start in the final

Personal bests
Outdoor
100 metres – 11.43 (+2.0 m/s, Hiroshima 2011)
200 metres – 23.39 (-0.2 m/s, Osaka 2017)
400 metres – 54.14	(Nagasaki 2014)

References

All-Athletics profile

External links 
 
 

1991 births
Living people
People from Toyota, Aichi
Japanese female sprinters
Olympic female sprinters
Olympic athletes of Japan
Athletes (track and field) at the 2012 Summer Olympics
Asian Games medalists in athletics (track and field)
Asian Games silver medalists for Japan
Asian Games bronze medalists for Japan
Athletes (track and field) at the 2014 Asian Games
Athletes (track and field) at the 2018 Asian Games
Medalists at the 2014 Asian Games
World Athletics Championships athletes for Japan
Japan Championships in Athletics winners
Competitors at the 2011 Summer Universiade
20th-century Japanese women
21st-century Japanese women